Mikhaylovka is a village in Jalal-Abad Region of Kyrgyzstan. It is part of the Suzak District. Its population was 6,488 in 2021.

Population

References

Populated places in Jalal-Abad Region